The smoky white-toothed shrew (Crocidura fumosa) is a species of mammal in the family Soricidae. It is endemic to Kenya.  Its natural habitat is subtropical or tropical moist montane forests.

References

Mammals of Kenya
Crocidura
Endemic fauna of Kenya
Mammals described in 1904
Taxa named by Oldfield Thomas
Taxonomy articles created by Polbot